Goni Modu Zanna Bura was elected Senator for the Yobe East constituency of Yobe State, Nigeria at the start of the Nigerian Fourth Republic, running on the People's Democratic Party (PDP) platform. He took office on 29 May 1999.
After taking his seat in the Senate in June 1999 he was appointed to committees on Ethics, Environment, Health, State & Local Government and Government Affairs.
He was a contender to be PDP candidate for Yobe State Governor in the 2003 elections.

References

Living people
Yobe State
Peoples Democratic Party members of the Senate (Nigeria)
20th-century Nigerian politicians
21st-century Nigerian politicians
1960 births